The Bhadbhada dam is a set of 11 sluice gates at the south-east corner of Upper lake in Bhopal. It was constructed in 1965. The gates are used to control the outflow of water from the lake to Kaliasote river, and are usually opened only when the city receives heavy rainfall during the monsoon season. It has a full tank level of 1666.80 feet.

References

Dams in Madhya Pradesh
Tourist attractions in Bhopal
Buildings and structures in Bhopal
1965 establishments in Madhya Pradesh